Darktown is a former African-American neighbourhood of Atlanta, Georgia U.S.

Darktown or Dark Town may also refer to:
 Darktown (album), a 1999 album by Steve Hackett
Darktown Comics, a series of racist-caricature prints produced by Currier and Ives
 Darktown Revue, a 1931 film
 Darktown Strutters,  a 1975 blaxploitation musical comedy film
 "Darktown Strutters Ball", a 1917 song composed by Shelton Brooks, and recorded by Ella Fitzgerald and others
 Dark Town, a comic book by Canadian cartoonist Kaja Blackley
 Darktown, a 2016 novel by Thomas Mullen